Eupithecia gigantea is a moth in the  family Geometridae. It is found in the Russian Far East, Japan and Korea.

The wingspan is about 27 mm. The ground colour of the wings is greyish.

The larvae feed within the cones of Pinus strobus and Abies sachalinensis.

References

Moths described in 1897
gigantea
Moths of Asia